Where It's At is a Canadian music television series which aired on CBC Television from 1968 to 1969.

Premise
Episodes featured rock and pop music selections, produced in various CBC production cities:

 Halifax: host Frank Cameron, producer Paul Baylis
 Montreal: host Robert Demontigny, producer Ed Mercel
 Toronto: host Jay Jackson with The Majestics, producer Allan Angus.
 Vancouver: host Fred Latremouille, producer Ken Gibson
 Winnipeg: producer Larry Brown

Anne Murray and The Lincolns were regularly featured on the Halifax episodes, while The Guess Who were frequently seen from Winnipeg and Susan Jacks (Pesklevits) a regular performer on the Vancouver editions.

Production
Black-and-white episodes were produced from Halifax and Vancouver while colour broadcasts originated from the other production cities.

Scheduling
This half-hour series was broadcast weekdays at 5:30 p.m. (Eastern time) from 30 September 1968 to 23 June 1969.

See also
 Music Hop
 Let's Go
 One More Time (Canadian TV series)

References

External links
 
 Jimi Hendrix, Vanilla Fudge, Northwest Company on WHERE IT'S AT

CBC Television original programming
1968 Canadian television series debuts
1969 Canadian television series endings